Photon diffusion is a situation where photons travel through a material without being absorbed, but rather undergoing repeated scattering events which change the direction of their path. The path of any given photon is then effectively a random walk. A large ensemble of such photons can be said to exhibit diffusion in the material, and can be described with a diffusion equation.

Astrophysics
In astrophysics, photon diffusion occurs inside a stellar atmosphere. To describe this phenomenon, one should develop the transfer equation in moments and use the Eddington approximation to radiative transfer (i.e. the diffusion approximation). In 3D the results are two equations for the photon energy flux:

where  is the opacity. By substituting the first equation into the second, one obtains the diffusion equation for the photon energy density:

Medical science
In medicine, the diffusion of photons can be used to create images of the body (mainly brain and breast) and has contributed much to the advance of certain fields of research, such as neuroscience. This technique is known as diffuse optical imaging.

See also
 Diffuse reflection
 Diffusion damping
 Global dimming
 Medical optical imaging
 Optical tomography
 Radiative transfer equation and diffusion theory for photon transport in biological tissue

References

Diffusion
Photonics